The streak-headed antbird (Drymophila striaticeps) is a species of bird in the family Thamnophilidae. It is found in humid highland forests, especially near bamboo, ranging through the Andes from Bolivia to Colombia. This 15 cm (6 in) bird is found at higher elevations. It was previously considered conspecific with the long-tailed antbird.

References

External links

streak-headed antbird
Birds of the Northern Andes
streak-headed antbird